Sukhbir Singh is an Indian singer. He is often referred to as the "Prince of Bhangra". His Bhangra music varied from fusion to pure Punjabi at times.

Early life
Sukhbir Singh was born in bhogpur Jalandhar, Punjab, India but moved with his family to Nairobi, Kenya, and was raised there. He spent 20 years in Nairobi. He began recording in 1991 and moved to Dubai in 1992, where he has been based ever since.

Music
His first album. New Stylee, was recorded in Dubai and had many foreign influences. The album though, was nominated and won the 1996 Channel V Awards in three categories: Best Debut Album, Best Male Vocalist and Best Music Video (for "Punjabi Munde") This album was followed by another, Gal Ban Gayi, and then a third called Hai Energy.Gal Ban Gayi went Platinum in 1997.

His other album, Dil Kare, includes hits such as the title song and Nachle Soniye. The video to the song 'Girls Girls Girls' features various Indian actresses, including Prachi Desai, Lara Dutta, Priyanka Chopra and Divya Chauhan.

Sukhbir's Bhangra is a fusion of Bhangra with rap, techno and reggae. The juxtaposition of these musical styles is enhanced by Sukhbir's use of original Bhangra instruments like the dhol and dholak.  In Oi Triesto, his music was complemented by Spanish and Portuguese rhythms, while he also uses instruments like: tablas, congos, guitars and keyboards in his music.

He sang the song Dil laga from Dhoom 2. He has also sung a song with Canadian band Josh. When the tsunami occurred he sang a song with Jassi Sidhu, Shin, DCS and Taz, stereo nation. 
He made a guest appearance in a 2012 Punjabi Film Pata Nahi Rabb Kehdeyan Rangan Ch Raazi as himself.
He is back to singing now and his new album is Tere naal nachna.
In 2021, he released the track 'Nachdi', featuring Arjun which peaked at No.4 on the Billboard Top Triller Global Charts.

Discography
 New Stylee (1996)
 Gal Ban Gayee (1997)
 Hai Energy (1999)
 "Ishq Tera Tadpave (Oh Ho Ho Ho)" (1999)
 Prince of Bhangra Volume 1 (2000)
 Oi! Triesto (1995)
 Dil Kare (2001)
 Sukhbir - Greatest Hits (2002)
 Tere Naal Nachna (2008)
 Nirgun Raakh Liya (2009)
 Putt Sardara Da - Pata Nahi Rabb Kehdeyan Rangan Ch Raazi  (2012)
 Ni Hogaya Re Pyar Soniye (2012)
 Nachle Mere Yaar (2012)
 Gal Ban Gayi (Reworked by Meet Bros) (2016)
 "Oh Ho Ho Ho" (2017) (Hindi Medium)
 Sauda Khara Khara (2019) Good Newwz
 Sade Dil Vich (2020) (Reworked by DJ Harshit Shah)
 Nachdi (2021)
 Nachdi - Remix (2021) (Reworked by DJ Harshit Shah)
 "Billi Billi" (2023) (Kisi Ka Bhai Kisi Ki Jaan)

Personal life
He is based out of Dubai with his wife Dimpy. He has a twin daughter and son.

References

External links
 Sukhbir Facebook Page
 Sukhbir Twitter Page
 Third time lucky Sukhbir The Tribune - 18 September 1998

Living people
Bhangra (music) musicians
Punjabi people
Performers of Sikh music
Kenyan musicians
People from Jalandhar
Indian male singer-songwriters
Indian singer-songwriters
Indian emigrants to Kenya
Indian emigrants to the United Arab Emirates
Year of birth missing (living people)